Pluots, apriums, apriplums, plumcots or pluclots are some of the hybrids between different Prunus species that are also called interspecific plums. Whereas plumcots and apriplums are first-generation hybrids between a plum parent (P. salicina) and an apricot (P. armeniaca), pluots and apriums are later-generations. Both names "plumcot" and "apriplum" have been used for trees derived from a plum seed parent, and are therefore equivalent.

Plumcots and apriplums

Natural plumcots (also called apriplums) have been known for hundreds of years from regions of the world that grow both plums and apricots from seed. The name plumcot was coined by Luther Burbank. The plumcot tree can reproduce asexually by budding whereas the apriplum tree resulted from hybridized seedlings and cannot reproduce.

Pluots
Pluots  are later generations of complex hybrid between the Japanese plum, Prunus salicina (providing the greater amount of parentage), and the apricot, Prunus armeniaca. The fruit's exterior has smooth skin closely resembling that of a plum. Pluots were developed in the late 20th century by Floyd Zaiger.

Apriums

Floyd Zaiger created the aprium, a hybrid cross between apricots and plums but more similar to apricots. Apriums are complex plum-apricot hybrids that show primarily apricot traits and flavor. Apriums resemble apricots on the outside. The flesh is usually dense and notable for its sweet taste due to a high content of fructose and other sugars. Apriums are usually only available early in the fruit season, like apricots and unlike pluots, which include some very late-ripening varieties. Aprium trees grow quickly and are smaller compared to other common home-grown apricots. The fruit is gold, with red coloration. Semi-mature fruit is hard and does not ripen if picked before completely mature.

Varieties

Plumcot varieties

Plumcot varieties include:
 Flavorosa: very sweet, medium-sized, flat round dark-purple fruit with red flesh, early ripening
 Flavor Royal: very sweet, medium-sized, dark purple with crimson flesh, early ripening
 Eagle Egg: very sweet, medium-sized, dark red with crimson flesh, early mid season
 Amigo: rosy plum flavors with a hint of berry, red skin with red bleeding to yellow flesh, early mid season
 Tropical Plumana: sugary tropical punch flavor, medium-sized, red over greenish yellow background with yellow flesh, early mid season
 Crimson Sweet: sweet flavor, medium-sized, crimson skin with pinkish flesh, mid season
 Dapple Jack: medium size with mottled pale green, red-spotted skin, red juicy flesh, late mid season
 Sweet Treat: super sweet with hints of Thompson grape flavor, green, golden skin with yellow juicy flesh, late mid season
 Flavor Queen: medium to large size, very juicy flesh, very sweet, golden yellow when fully ripe, late season
 Flavor Grenade: large size, oblong shape with red blush on green background, crisp, refreshing pineapple and juicy apple flavor, late season
 Summer Punch: medium to large size, very juicy flesh, very sweet with berry and melon undertones, late season
 Tropical Sunrise: Yellow to orange color skin with red blush and orange flesh, sweet plum and apricot flavors
 Flavor King: fruit punch flavor, medium size, with burgundy skin and red, super sweet, juicy flesh, late season
 King Kong: very large size with black skin, plum-like flavor with hints of almond
 Flavor Fall: large size, average flavor, red skin with yellow flesh, very late season

Pluot varieties

Pluot varieties include:
Dapple Dandy: large size with mottled pale green to yellow, red-spotted skin, red or pink juicy flesh, firm flesh, moderately late ripening.
'Dinosaur egg' is a trademarked name for Dapple Dandy variety.
Early Dapple: good flavor, medium-sized, mottled green over red skin with pink flesh, early ripening
Emerald Drop: medium to large size, green skin and yellow-orange flesh, moderately late ripening
Flavor Delight: medium-sized, fuchsia-honey colored skin with pink flesh, early ripening
Flavor Fall: large size, average flavor, red skin with yellow flesh, late ripening
Flavor Finale: medium to large size, purple-red skin with amber-red flesh, exceptional complex flavor, late ripening
Flavor Grenade: large size, oblong shape with red blush on green background, yellow juicy flesh, moderately late ripening
Flavor Heart: very large, black with a heart shape, and yellow flesh
Flavor Jewel: sweet flavor, heart shaped, red over yellow skin with yellow flesh
Flavor King: Fruit punch flavor, medium size, with burgundy skin and red super sweet juicy flesh, moderately late ripening, flesh is hard until fully ripe
Flavor Prince: large round and purple, with red flesh
Flavor Queen: medium to large size, very juicy flesh, very sweet, golden yellow when fully ripe, midseason
Flavor Rich: medium-sweet, large black round fruit with orange flesh
Flavor Royal: very sweet, medium-sized, dark purple with crimson flesh, very early ripening
Flavor Supreme: medium or large, greenish purple skin, juicy red flesh
Flavorich: large size, dark purple skin and firm, sweet, yellow-orange flesh, moderately late ripening
Flavorosa: very sweet, medium-sized, flat, round, dark-purple fruit with red flesh, very early ripening
Geo Pride: medium size, red-skin and yellow flesh, balanced acid-sugar, predominately sweet with unique plum/apricot flavor, moderately late ripening
Raspberry Jewel: medium, dark red skin, brilliant red, honey-sweet flesh
Red Ray: medium, bright red with dense, sweet orange flesh
Splash: small to medium red-orange fruit, with very sweet orange flesh, midseason

Aprium varieties

Aprium varieties include:
Cot-N-Candy : harvests in early to mid June, flesh is extra sweet and juicy, with a plummy aftertaste, size is 2.0 to 2.5 inches in radius on average, self-fruitful
Flavor Delight : resembles an apricot, but with a distinctive flavor and texture all its own, pleasant, lingering aftertaste, bigger crops if pollinized by any apricot
Tasty Rich Aprium: Very early harvests, in May. Light yellow-orange, firm, freestone. Flavor predominantly apricot, with pleasant aftertaste

See also 

 Nectaplum
 Peacotum
 Prunus brigantina, an apricot species with smooth-skinned fruit
 Prunus dasycarpa, an apricot hybrid known as "black apricot" or "purple apricot"

References 

Hybrid prunus